Governor Metcalfe may refer to:

Charles Metcalfe, 1st Baron Metcalfe (1785–1846), Governor of Agra from 1834 to 1835, Acting Governor-General of India from 1835 to 1836, Governor of Jamaica from 1839 to 1842, and Governor General of the Province of Canada from 1843 to 1845
Richard Lee Metcalfe (1861–1954), Military Governor of Panama Canal Zone from 1913 to 1914
Thomas Metcalfe (Kentucky politician) (1780–1855), 10th Governor of Kentucky

See also
Ralph Metcalf (New Hampshire politician) (1796–1858), 25th Governor of New Hampshire